Viet refers to Vietnamese people.

Viet may also refer to:

People
Viet Cuong (composer), American classical composer
Viet D. Dinh, American lawyer
Viet Nguyen, American soccer player
Viet Pham, American chef
Viet Thanh Nguyen, American novelist
Viet Xuan Luong, United States Army major general

See also

Viets (disambiguation)
Viet Hong (disambiguation)
Viet Hung (disambiguation)
Viet Minh
Viet Cong